Chicken Vulture Crow is the first album by Swamp Zombies. It was released on record in 1988.

Track listing
"Truly Needy"
"Love Zombie"
"Swamp Boy"
"Open Up Your Eyes"
"Pots and Pans"
"Coffeehouse Ray"
"Purple Haze" (originally by The Jimi Hendrix Experience)
"Zombie Jamboree" (originally by The Kingston Trio)
"Chucha"
"A Simple Desultory" (originally by Simon and Garfunkel)
"Phobia"
"Rudy the Magic Crow"

References

Swamp Zombies albums
1988 debut albums